Gesila Khan is the current Resident Electoral Commissioner of the Independent National Electoral Commission Cross River State Branch. She held the same position at the Delta State Branch from 2012 to 2014 and at the Rivers State Branch from 2014 to 2016.

Personal life
Khan is originally from Bayelsa State, in southern Nigeria. She is married.

References

Living people
People from Bayelsa State
Nigerian civil servants
Nigerian Electoral Commissioners
Members of the Independent National Electoral Commission
Year of birth missing (living people)